"She's Hearing Voices" is a song by Bloc Party that was first released on 7"  vinyl by London-based independent label Trash Aesthetics in February 2004. It also appeared on their 2004 Bloc Party (EP). The song was later re-recorded for the band's 2005 debut album Silent Alarm, while "The Marshals Are Dead" was re-recorded and released on the 7" and DVD single versions of the "So Here We Are" single.

The song is supposedly about "a paranoid schizophrenic", a friend of frontman Kele Okereke.

Track listing

7" single
 "She's Hearing Voices"
 "The Marshals Are Dead"
 "The Answer"

References

2004 debut singles
Bloc Party songs
2004 songs
Songs written by Kele Okereke
Songs written by Gordon Moakes
Songs written by Russell Lissack
Songs written by Matt Tong